Jubilee Peak is a peak rising to about  at the north end of Clarence Island, west of Cape Lloyd, in the South Shetland Islands. Following the ascent of the peak by a JSEEIG party, February 2, 1977, it was named by the UK Antarctic Place-Names Committee in honor of the Silver Jubilee year of Her Majesty Queen Elizabeth II.

The team that carried out the first ascent was composed of Commander John Highton, Royal Navy (Leader), Captain Chris Hurran, Royal Engineers, and Lieutenant Mike Wimpenny, Royal Marines.

References

Mountains of Antarctica